Michael may refer to:

People

 Michael (given name), a given name
 Michael (surname), including a list of people with the surname Michael

Given name "Michael"

 Michael (archangel), first of God's archangels in the Jewish, Christian and Islamic religions
 Michael (bishop elect), English 13th-century Bishop of Hereford elect
 Michael (Khoroshy) (1885–1977), cleric of the Ukrainian Orthodox Church of Canada
 Michael Donnellan (1915–1985), Irish-born London fashion designer, often referred to simply as "Michael"
 Michael (footballer, born 1982), Brazilian footballer
 Michael (footballer, born 1983), Brazilian footballer
 Michael (footballer, born 1993), Brazilian footballer
 Michael (footballer, born February 1996), Brazilian footballer
 Michael (footballer, born March 1996), Brazilian footballer
 Michael (footballer, born 1999), Brazilian footballer

Rulers

Byzantine emperors 
Michael I Rangabe (d. 844), married the daughter of Emperor Nikephoros I
Michael II (770–829), called "the Stammerer" and "the Amorian"
Michael III (840–867), called "the Drunkard", youngest child of Theophilos
Michael IV the Paphlagonian (1010–1041), husband of Zoë, came from a peasant family
Michael V Kalaphates (1015–1042), or "the Caulker", nephew of Michael IV
Michael VI Bringas (d. 1059), called "Stratiotikos", chosen by Theodora
Michael VII Doukas (c. 1050–1078), called "Parapinakes", eldest son of Constantine X
Michael VIII Palaiologos (1223–1282), founder of the Palaeologan dynasty
Michael IX Palaiologos (1277–1320), eldest son of Andronikos II

Portuguese rulers 
 Miguel da Paz, Prince of Portugal and Prince of Asturias (1498–1500), son of King Manuel I of Portugal
 Miguel de Bragança, 1st Duke of Lafões (1699–1724), illegitimate son of King Pedro II of Portugal, drowned
 Miguel I of Portugal (1802–1866), forced to abdicate in 1834
 Prince Miguel, Duke of Braganza (1853–1927), claimant to the throne in exile
 Prince Miguel, Duke of Viseu (1878–1923), eldest son of Miguel, Duke of Braganza

Russian rulers 
 Mikhail of Vladimir (d. 1176), eldest son of Yuri Dolgoruky by his second marriage
 Mikhail of Tver (1271–1318), second son of Yaroslav III
 Michael of Russia (1596–1645), first Russian Tsar of the house of Romanov
 Grand Duke Michael Alexandrovich of Russia (1878–1918), the younger brother of Tsar Nicholas II

Bulgarian rulers 
 Boris-Michael (d. 907), knyaz of Bulgaria
 Michael II Asen (1238/41–1256), tsar of Bulgaria, son of Ivan Asen II
 Michael (1270–after 1302), only known son of Constantine Tikh 
 Michael III Shishman (after 1280–1330), tsar founder of the House of Shishman

Other rulers and noblemen 
 Michael (son of Anastasios the logothete) (fl. 1042–58), Byzantine general and governor
 Michał Korybut Wiśniowiecki (1640–1673), King of the Polish-Lithuanian Commonwealth
 Mikhail, Prince of Abkhazia (died 1866)
 Michael I of Romania (1921-2017)
 Michael the Brave (1558–1601), Prince of Wallachia, Moldavia and Transylvania for a year.
 Prince Michael of Greece and Denmark (born 1939)
 Michael, Prince of Saxe-Weimar-Eisenach (born 1946)

Arts and entertainment

Film
 Michael (1924 film), a German silent film directed by Carl Theodor Dreyer
 Michael (1996 film), an American fantasy film directed by Nora Ephron
 Michael (2011 Austrian film), a drama film directed by Markus Schleinzer
 Michael (2011 Indian film), a psychological thriller film directed by Ribhu Dasgupta
 Mikhael (film), a 2019 Indian Malayalam-language film
 I Am Michael (working title Michael), a 2015 American film by Justin Kelly
 Michael (release date TBC), a biopic based on the life and career of Michael Jackson.

Literature
 Michael (novel), a 1929 semi-autobiographical novel by Joseph Goebbels
 "Michael" (poem), an 1880 poem by William Wordsworth

Music
 Michael (album), by Michael Jackson, 2010
 "Michael" (Franz Ferdinand song), 2004
 "Michael (the Lover)", a song by the C.O.D.'s, 1965; covered by Geno Washington & the Ram Jam Band, 1967
 "Michael", a song by Rob Zombie from Hellbilly Deluxe 2, 2010
 "Michael", a song by Suzi Quatro from Your Mamma Won't Like Me, 1975

Television
 "Michael" (Glee), a 2012 episode
 "Michael" (Stargate Atlantis), a 2006 episode

Ships

Great Michael, also called Michael, a 16th-century carrack of the Kingdom of Scotland
, a Greek cargo ship in service from 1959
, a CAM Ship sunk on her maiden voyage in 1941

Other uses
Michael (gorilla), the first male gorilla to use American Sign Language
Michael, Isle of Man, an administrative sheading (district)
MICHAEL, a message integrity check used in the Temporal Key Integrity Protocol
Operation Michael, a German attack in the Spring Offensive of World War I

See also
List of hurricanes named Michael
Hurricane Michael, an especially severe storm in 2018
Michaels (disambiguation), variant of Michael, often a surname
Mickey (disambiguation), common name derived from Michael
Mike (disambiguation), common name derived from Michael, with other meanings
Micheal, Gaelic name
Michel (disambiguation), French language variant of Michael
Michele (given name), Italian language variant (male given name)
Miguel (disambiguation), Spanish and Portuguese language variant of Michael
Mikhail (disambiguation)